The 1982 US Open was a tennis tournament played on outdoor hard courts at the USTA National Tennis Center in New York City in New York in the United States. It was the 102nd edition of the US Open and was held from August 31 to September 12, 1982.

Seniors

Men's singles

 Jimmy Connors defeated  Ivan Lendl 6–3, 6–2, 4–6, 6–4
 It was Connors's 7th career Grand Slam title and his 4th US Open title.

Women's singles

 Chris Evert-Lloyd defeated  Hana Mandlíková 6–3, 6–1
 It was Evert-Lloyd's 16th career Grand Slam title and her 6th and last US Open title.

Men's doubles

 Kevin Curren /  Steve Denton defeated  Victor Amaya /  Hank Pfister 6–2, 6–7(4–7), 5–7, 6–2, 6–4
 It was Curren's 3rd career Grand Slam title and his 2nd US Open title. It was Denton's only career Grand Slam title.

Women's doubles

 Rosemary Casals /  Wendy Turnbull defeated  Barbara Potter /  Sharon Walsh 6–4, 6–4
 It was Casals' 12th and last career Grand Slam title and her 5th US Open title. It was Turnbull's 7th career Grand Slam title and her 3rd and last US Open title.

Mixed doubles

 Anne Smith /  Kevin Curren defeated  Barbara Potter /  Ferdi Taygan 6–7, 7–6 (7–4), 7–6(7–5)
 It was Smith's 9th career Grand Slam title and her 3rd and last US Open title. It was Curren's 4th and last career Grand Slam title and his 3rd US Open title.

Juniors

Boys' singles

 Pat Cash defeated  Guy Forget 6–3, 6–3

Girls' singles

 Beth Herr defeated  Gretchen Rush 6–3, 6–1

Boys' doubles

 Jonathan Canter /  Michael Kures defeated  Pat Cash /  John Frawley 7–6, 6–3

Girls' doubles

 Penny Barg /  Beth Herr defeated  Ann Hulbert /  Bernadette Randall 1–6, 7–5, 7–6

Prize money

Total prize money for the event was $1,386,000, including Grand Prix contribution $1,516,000.

References

External links
 Official US Open website

 
 

 
US Open
US Open (tennis) by year
1982 in sports in New York City
1982 in American tennis
US open
US open